P. B. Sunil Kumar is an Indian physicist, professor and the founding director of IIT Palakkad (January 2017 to September 2022). He also holds professorship(on lien) at Department of Physics, IIT Madras. He is known for his research on Soft matter and Biological Physics. He is an elected member of Kerala Science Congress.

Awards and honors
Prof. M. V. Pylee Award (2019)
Fellow of Indian Academy of Sciences (2016)
Fellow of Indian National Science Academy (2023)

Selected bibliography

Books

Chapter
Kumar P.B.S., Laradji M. (2018) Protein-Induced Morphological Deformations of Biomembranes. In: Bassereau P., Sens P. (eds) Physics of Biological Membranes. Springer, Cham.

Selected articles

References

Living people
Indian Institute of Technology directors
University of Calicut alumni
People from Kerala
Academic staff of IIT Madras
Year of birth missing (living people)